Tamborine Mountain State High School (TMSHS) is a co-educational, state secondary school located on Tamborine Mountain, Queensland, Australia. Education Queensland has implemented an enrolment catchment area for Tamborine Mountain State High School.

History
Tamborine Mountain State High School originally opened its doors in 1999 as an annex of Helensvale State High School with approximately 150 students from Years 8 and 9. When the school was opened by former Premier Peter Beattie it was said that the school would be extended to Year 12 in 2001. In 2001 the school was given its independence and became a full-fledged high school. The first group of Year 12s graduated in 2002.

Defamation Case

In 2019 Tamborine Mountain State High School principal Tracey Brose launched defamation action against five parents, claiming more than $1 million in damages for comments made about her on Facebook and a Change.org petition while she was temporarily suspended from her job in 2016. In 2020 Judge Catherine Muir ruled in favour of Brose and ordered Donna and Miguel Baluskas to pay $3000 in damages each.

References

External links
 Education Queensland website 
 Tamborine Mountain State High School website

Public high schools in Queensland
Schools in South East Queensland
Tamborine Mountain
Educational institutions established in 1999
1999 establishments in Australia